Ramón Rodríguez was President of El Salvador 1–4 February 1850.

Presidents of El Salvador
Year of birth missing
Year of death missing
19th-century Salvadoran people